Pyotr Fyodorovich Borel was a Russian painter and illustrator, one of the leading portraitist of his time in Russia.

An Imperial Academy of Arts alumnus, Borel became famous for his massive series of lithographic portraits, including The Lyceum of Prince Bezborodko (1859), the Gallery of Russian Statesmen (six volumes, 1860–1869), Portraits of Russian Priests (1860—1862) and, in particular, The Gallery of the Russian Heroes and Chief Commanders in the 1853-1856 Crimean War (1857—1863), the latter amounting to more than 400 portraits. Borel was an avid contributor to the magazines Khudozhestvenny Listok (Art Leaflet, 1868–1870), Vsemirnaya Illustratsiya (1871—1895) and Sever (North, 1889–1895). Also highly successful were his watercolour landscapes.

References 

19th-century painters from the Russian Empire
1829 births
1898 deaths